The Lega Basket Serie A (LBA) Finals Most Valuable Player (MVP) is an annual award given by the 1st-tier of Italian professional basketball, the Lega Basket Serie A (LBA). It has been awarded since the 2003–04 season to the league's most valuable player in the league's deciding Finals series of the playoffs.

Winners

Player nationalities by national team.

See also
Lega Basket Serie A MVP
Lega Basket Serie A awards

Notes

References

Finals MVP